Husk is a surname. People with this surname include:

 Cecil Husk (1847–1920), British professional singer and spiritualist medium
 William Henry Husk (1814–1887), English historian of music and critic